Common Thread is the third studio album by Spermbirds – a hardcore punk band from Germany. It was released on X-Mist Records in 1990 and follows 1987's Nothing Is Easy. Also, in the same year, came a live album entitled Thanks, which was released on We Bite Records.

Due to vocalist Lee Hollis' American descent, all lyrics were written by him and sung in English – which also helped them break into a wider European and American audience.

The album was rereleased on Boss Tuneage in 2006 with 3 bonus tracks as a digipack CD and a Picture Disc LP.

Track listing
"Melt the Ice" (Matthias Götte, Lee Hollis) – 3:15
"Open Letter" (Frank Rahm, Hollis) – 1:59
"Two Feet" (Rahm, Hollis) – 2:28
"Stronger" (Roger Ingenthron, Hollis) – 2:19
"Only a Phase" (Götte, Hollis) – 4:03
"One Chance" (Rahm, Hollis) – 2:12
"With a Gun" (Rahm, Hollis) – 2:51
"Common Thread" (Ingenthron, Hollis) – 2:20
"Truth of Today" (Götte, Hollis) – 3:55
"Victim of Yourself" (Rahm, Hollis) – 4:33

Credits
Lee Hobson Hollis – vocals
Frank Rahm – guitar
Roger Ingenthron – guitar
Markus Weilemann – bass
Matthias "Beppo" Götte – drums
 Yvonne Ducksworth – backing vocals on "Stronger"
 Recorded in January – February, 1990 at Vielklang Studios, Berlin, Germany by Georg Kalere
 Mixed by Spermbirds and Georg Kalere

References

External links
Spermbirds official website
Spermbirds fan page

1990 albums
Spermbirds albums